The Lavandevil Wildlife Refuge is a wildlife habitat conservation area located in northwestern Iran, along the Caspian Sea coast just north of the city of Lavandevil.

It was noted in 1991 for the first official siting of the North American Raccoon in Iran, an invasive species known to have entered Iran from the northern Caucasus region where it had been deliberately introduced by the Soviet Union.

References

Geography of Gilan Province
Protected areas of Iran